The Tai-Leng Nationalities Development Party (abbreviated TNDP or TLNDP), also known as the Shanni Nationalities Development Party (SNDP), is a minor political party in Myanmar (Burma). The party seeks to represent the Shan-ni people (also known as the Red Shan), who live in Kachin State and northern Sagaing Region.

References

Political parties in Myanmar
Political parties established in 2012
2012 establishments in Myanmar